Non-profit space agencies include:

 Celestrak.org (United States)
 Center for the Advancement of Science in Space (United States)
 International Space Science Institute (Switzerland)
 KAIST Satellite Technology Research Center (South Korea)
 Mars Institute (United States)
 Space Foundation (United States)
 The Planetary Society (United States)
 WARR (TUM), Technical University of Munich (Germany)

See also
 List of government space agencies
 List of private spaceflight companies

Lists of space agencies